Papakura is a southern suburb of Auckland, in northern New Zealand. It is located on the shores of the Pahurehure Inlet, approximately 32 kilometres south of the Auckland CBD. It is under the authority of the Auckland Council.

Papakura is a Māori word believed to have originated from papa, meaning earth or flat (abbreviation of Papatūānuku) and kura meaning red, reflecting the rich, fertile soil upon which the community was founded.

History
A village was established at Papakura in the late 1840s by a small group of settler families who sought to farm in the area. Among these early settlers was George Cole, a Welsh immigrant whose legacy in the town has been preserved through Coles Crescent, one of the major thoroughfares in the town centre. The tract of land that was initially purchased was subdivided in 1853, with the street layout that was built initially remaining largely in place today.

In 1862, construction of the Great South Road, from Auckland to the Waikato, commenced. The road passed through Papakura and was constructed during the New Zealand Wars to transport supplies to the colonial militias and British Army forces fighting in the Invasion of the Waikato. It was guarded by armed constabulary and was a designated military road. It remains the primary north-south thoroughfare through Papakura and part of the road forms the main street of the Papakura town centre.

In 1875, Papakura railway station opened, linking the town to Auckland to the north and Hamilton to the south. In 1882, the Papakura Town District was established, for many years the only such district within what is now the southern portion of the Auckland urban area. In spite of this, the town was not particularly developed, and by 1914 had a population of just 700.

In the latter 19th century, Papakura was an important location for the kauri gum trade. Papakura township was adjacent to the large Ardmore Gumfield (also known as the Papakura Gumfield), which stretched from Manurewa to Clevedon. By the 1900s, the gumfields started being converted into farmland and orchards.

In 1911, the first controlled powered flight in New Zealand took place in Papakura. The flight took place inside a single paddock within the racecourse of the now-defunct Papakura Racing Club. The flight was piloted by Vivian Walsh and was carried out in a Howard Wright 1910 Biplane, the parts for which were imported from England in 1910 and assembled by members of the Auckland Aeroplane Syndicate.

The Papakura Military Camp was established on the outskirts of the town in 1939 and remains an important base for the New Zealand Army, being the home of the New Zealand Special Air Service. The camp was initially built by the Stevenson family construction business. In the early 2000s some land was set aside for new housing developments.

During the major reformation of local government in 1989, Papakura became a district. Prior to 1989, a smaller area was known as Papakura City. The new district included parts of the surrounding rural countryside that had previously been part of Manukau City. The newly amalgamated area was known as the Papakura District. Instead of being an independent city, as Papakura had been previously, the district became a part of the also newly-created Auckland Regional Council area.

From October 2010, after a review of the Royal Commission on Auckland Governance, the various cities and districts of the Auckland Region were amalgamated into a single unitary authority, governed by the Auckland Council. As well as the Papakura District, the other cities and districts within the Auckland Region, such as the neighbouring Manukau City, as well as the regional council itself, were abolished with the entire area merged into a single authority. Papakura and the other suburbs of the former Papakura District are now in the Papakura Local Board within the Manurewa-Papakura Ward of the Auckland Council. The entirety of Papakura and the former district is included as part of the Auckland urban area for statistical purposes, forming part of its southern boundary.

Demographics

Papakura had a population of 22,500 at the 2018 New Zealand census, an increase of 3,276 people (17.0%) since the 2013 census, and an increase of 4,833 people (27.4%) since the 2006 census. There were 6,636 households, comprising 11,085 males and 11,412 females, giving a sex ratio of 0.97 males per female, with 5,745 people (25.5%) aged under 15 years, 5,238 (23.3%) aged 15 to 29, 9,279 (41.2%) aged 30 to 64, and 2,232 (9.9%) aged 65 or older.

Ethnicities were 46.3% European/Pākehā, 34.2% Māori, 21.6% Pacific peoples, 16.9% Asian, and 2.7% other ethnicities. People may identify with more than one ethnicity.

The percentage of people born overseas was 25.7, compared with 27.1% nationally.

Although some people chose not to answer the census's question about religious affiliation, 40.9% had no religion, 37.6% were Christian, 3.3% had Māori religious beliefs, 5.0% were Hindu, 1.4% were Muslim, 0.9% were Buddhist and 4.1% had other religions.

Of those at least 15 years old, 2,346 (14.0%) people had a bachelor's or higher degree, and 3,885 (23.2%) people had no formal qualifications. 1,857 people (11.1%) earned over $70,000 compared to 17.2% nationally. The employment status of those at least 15 was that 8,463 (50.5%) people were employed full-time, 1,833 (10.9%) were part-time, and 1,119 (6.7%) were unemployed.

Most of Papakura is residential, with a commercial area on the western side. The area southeast of Papakura  is almost entirely industrial.

Education
The following schools are located in Papakura (schools in Takanini and other adjacent suburbs are excluded):

The school was established in 1954. In 2020, Māori students were 59% of the roll and Pacific Islands students were 29%.

The school opened in 1962. From 2000 to 2017 it was called Mansell Senior School. In 2018, Māori students were 74% of the roll and Pacific Islands students were 22%.

Papakura Normal opened as Papakura North School in 1953, and changed to its current name when it affiliated to Ardmore Teachers College in 1958. Edmund Hillary opened in 1963. Its name pays tribute to the mountaineer.

Papakura Central traces its origins back to 1876. Kelvin Road opened in 1968. Cosgrove opened in 1959.

All these schools are coeducational. Rolls are as of

Facilities

Government
In addition to the Local Council Chambers, Papakura is served by a large police station (one of Auckland's busiest), a District Court, and a WINZ office. In the Pitcairn sexual assault trial of 2004, the Papakura Courthouse was where the Pitcairn Supreme Court sat to hear the case.

Armed forces
Papakura once served a large military population, but now only the SAS special forces are based at Papakura. Nearby houses were originally Army Homes, but are now in private hands. The army base was made much smaller in the 2010s and become a residential area for a large number of modern houses, both detached and terraced. The subdivision is called McLennan Housing Development next to McLennan Park, home of Papakura Football Club. McLennan being the name of the farming brothers that first settled in the area from Scotland.

Transport

State Highway 1 and the North Island Main Trunk railway run through the Papakura District. State Highway 1 ran down Great South Road through central Papakura until 1965, when it was bypassed by the Auckland Southern Motorway.

Public transport is provided by train and bus services, with frequent trains on the Southern Line between Papakura and the CBD (Britomart). Recent investment has focused on upgrading and refurbishing the region's trains and suburban railway stations, most recently with the opening of a modern station facility at the town centre. Papakura is the final stop for most southbound public transport in Auckland, and Papakura is the third busiest station on the rail network. Drawn by frequent services into and out of the city, rail commuters come from Papakura itself, Franklin County and the northern Waikato.  Though the motorway and Great South Road flow relatively freely at peak times, road commuters are affected by the acute traffic congestion as they get closer to metropolitan Auckland.

Sport and recreation
Some notable sports facilities include an indoor-outdoor swimming pool, an international-quality athletics track, a sports stadium, and venues for rugby, netball, cricket, golf, tennis, badminton, soccer, and many other sports. The council also operates a library and a theatre. Papakura also has a number of skate parks, and a skate bowl.

Papakura is home to association football club Papakura City, who compete in the Lotto Sport Italia NRFL Division 2, rugby union club Papakura RFC who are members of  the Counties Manukau Rugby Union, rugby league club Papakura Sea Eagles, who compete in the Auckland Rugby League's Fox Memorial competition (division 1), and Papakura Cricket Club who compete in the Counties Manukau Cricket Association competition. Papakura and the surrounding area is represented by the Counties Manukau Steelers in first-class rugby union and Northern Districts in first-class cricket.

Museum

The Papakura Museum showcases the area's local history. It opened in 1972.

Notable people
 Fleur Adcock – Poet
 John Afoa  - Rugby union player, All Black
 Sir Edmund Hillary - Mountaineer and explorer
 Katrina Grant – Southern Steel and Silver Ferns netballer
 Lance Hamilton – International cricketer
 Jerome Kaino  - Rugby union player, All Black
 Keven Mealamu – Rugby union player, All Black
 Reg Mombassa – Artist and musician
 P-Money – Hip-hop DJ
 Blair Pocock – International cricketer
 Kieran Read – Rugby union player, All Black
 Joe Rokocoko – Rugby union player, All Black
 David Sabine – Cricketer
 Kimberley Smith – Long-distance runner
 John Walker – Middle-distance runner, Olympic gold medallist
 George Hawkins – Politician, Member of Parliament

Notable buildings 

 Christ Church (Anglican) established in 1862 with Selwyn Chapel.

References

External links
Photographs of Papakura held in Auckland Libraries' heritage collections.

Suburbs of Auckland
Populated places around the Manukau Harbour